Hlinaia (Hlynne, Glinnoye) is a village in the Grigoriopol sub-district of Transnistria, Moldova. The town of Hlinaia was founded in 1809 by German Evangelical emigrants under the name of Glückstal. It has since 1990 been administered as a part of the breakaway Pridnestrovian Moldavian Republic (PMR).

References

External links
 Black Sea Germans

Villages of Transnistria
Tiraspolsky Uyezd